The Women's American Football League (WAFL) was a women's American football league that was formed in 2001. After disbanding, the teams merged with the Women's Affiliated Football Conference (WAFC), the Independent Women's Football League (IWFL), Women's Football Association (WFA), and the American Football Women's League (AFWL), itself now disbanded.

Teams
Arizona Caliente WPFL
Alabama Slammers
Baton Rouge Wildcats IWFL
Orlando Fire
California Quake IWFL
Hawaii Legends
San Diego Sunfire
SF Tsunami
Oakland Banshees IWFL
Orlando Mayhem  IWFL
Tampa Bay Force
Jacksonville Dixie Blues
New Orleans Voodoo Dolls
Indianapolis Vipers
Rose City Wildcats
Seattle Warbirds
Sacramento Sirens IWFL
LA Lasers 
Minnesota Vixens (Exhibition) WPFL

Women's World Bowl
Season   Champion          Score  Runner-Up 

2001-02  California Quake  30-14  Jacksonville Dixie Blues

2002-03  Jacksonville Dixie Blues  68-20  Indianapolis Vipers

See also
Women's Professional Football League (WPFL)
Women's Football in the United States
List of leagues of American football
Legends Football League

References

External links
Women's Football Forums

Defunct American football leagues in the United States
Women's American football leagues